Ruel Dahis Antipuesto, known simply as Ruel Antipuesto, is a Cebuano film director and cinematographer from the Philippines. Considered as "The Godfather of Cebuano Filmmaking", he is a major contributor to the new wave of Cebuano filmmaking as he continues to mentor and collaborate with younger filmmakers while his works continue to gain national and international awards and recognition.

Biography
Ruel Dahis Antipuesto began as an engineer. When the filmmaking became digital in the late 1990s, he taught himself filmmaking by making animations and documentaries.

In 2004, the animated short film, The Snake's Pit won him his first national award.

In 2007, the full-length movie Confessional, he photographed and co-directed with Jerrold Tarog won several national awards as well as best first feature in OSIAN Cinefan in India. It was also in exhibition in Germany, South Korea and the United States. Soon after, his documentary projects were acquired for distribution and one won in the 2009 Cine-Indie MDG competition.

Through the years he has accumulated several awards as his works have been included in various local and international competitions and exhibitions held in Portugal, United Kingdom, Germany, South Korea, United States, India, France, Spain, Italy (in Venice and Rome), Canada, Switzerland, Russia, Brazil, Japan and the ASEAN region.

Filmography

References

External links

Motion Picture Society Of Cebu – Official website

Filipino film directors
1973 births
People from Misamis Occidental
People from Ozamiz
Filipino cinematographers
University of San Carlos alumni
Living people
Misamis Occidental